The death of Caesar (La mort de César) is a painting by Flemish artist Victor Honoré Janssens between 1658 and 1736 which depicts the assassination of Julius Caesar.

Description
The historical painting was realized between the end of the 17th and the beginning of the 18th century and is a Flemish classic painting, made from oil on canvas. The few years Janssens spent in Rome allowed him to assimilate the classicism of Roman painting, which permeated his works. It is signed in the lower right corner on the base of the sculpture "V. Janssens." The work which is based on Parallel Lives by Plutarch shows the typical classical artistic strokes of the time.

See also
 Cultural depictions of Julius Caesar

References

External links
 Iconographie de la mort de Jules César

1600s paintings
Paintings of the death of Julius Caesar
Paintings based on works by Plutarch